Issac Amaldas is an Indian boxer. He competed in the men's flyweight event at the 1980 Summer Olympics. At the 1980 Summer Olympics, he lost in his first fight to Jo Ryon-sik of North Korea.

References

External links
 

Year of birth missing (living people)
Living people
Indian male boxers
Olympic boxers of India
Boxers at the 1980 Summer Olympics
Place of birth missing (living people)
Flyweight boxers
Boxers at the 1982 Asian Games